Crawl, The Crawl, or crawling may refer to:

Biology
 Crawling (human), any of several types of human quadrupedal gait
 Limbless locomotion, the movement of limbless animals over the ground
 Undulatory locomotion, a type of motion characterized by wave-like movement patterns that act to propel an animal forward

Gaming
 Crawl (video game), a 2014 roguelike indie video game
 Dungeon crawl, a type of scenario in fantasy role-playing games
Linley's Dungeon Crawl or Crawl, a 1997 roguelike computer game
Dungeon Crawl Stone Soup, an ongoing open source fork of Linley's Dungeon Crawl

Music 
 The Crawl, backing band for Mike Morgan

Albums 
 Crawl (album), by Deen, 2010
 Crawl, by Coffin Break, or the title song, 1991
 Crawl (Entombed EP), 1991
 Crawl (Laughing Hyenas EP), 1992
 The Crawl (Louis Hayes album), 1990
 The Crawl (Mickey Tucker album) or the title song, 1980

Songs 
 "Crawl" (Atlas song), 2007
 "Crawl" (Childish Gambino song), 2014
 "Crawl" (Chris Brown song), 2009
 "Crawl" (Kings of Leon song), 2009
 "Crawling" (song), by Linkin Park, 2001
 "Crawl", by Alkaline Trio from From Here to Infirmary, 2001
 "Crawl", by Anthrax from Worship Music, 2011
 "Crawl", by Breaking Benjamin from Dear Agony, 2009
 "Crawl", by Damageplan from New Found Power, 2004
 "Crawl", by Norman Iceberg from Person(a), 1987
 "Crawl", by Soul Asylum from Let Your Dim Light Shine, 1995
 "Crawl", by Stabbing Westward from Dead and Gone, 2020
 "Crawl", by Staind from Dysfunction, 1999
 "Crawl", by Thisway, 1999
 "Crawlin, by Alice Cooper from Constrictor, 1986
 "Crawling", by Bullet for My Valentine from Gravity, 2018
 "Crawling", by Riot from Immortal Soul, 2011
 "The Crawl", by Placebo from Without You I'm Nothing, 1998
 "The Crawl", by Smash Mouth from Summer Girl, 2006

Television and film
 Crawl (2011 film), an Australian horror film
 Crawl (2019 film), an American horror film
 "Crawling" (Teletubbies), a television episode
 "The Crawl" (New Girl), a television episode
 News crawl or news ticker, a moving line of text on a TV screen

Other uses
 Crawl of websites for indexing or archiving purposes, using a web crawler
 Front crawl, a swimming stroke
 Pub crawl, an evening devoted to drinking at a series of pubs
 Rock crawling, an off-road truck sport

See also
 Formication, a sensation as if covered with crawling insects
 Star Wars opening crawl, the scrolling text at the beginning of the Star Wars films
 Crawler (disambiguation)